Amnart Chalermchaowarit (Thai อำนาจ เฉลิมชวลิต) is a Thai former footballer. He is one of the legend of Thai football who played in 1971–1985 for Thailand national football team, He got the nickname "Colonel Iron Bones".

References

External links
 

1951 births
Living people
Amnart Chalermchaowarit
Amnart Chalermchaowarit
1972 AFC Asian Cup players
Amnart Chalermchaowarit
Amnart Chalermchaowarit
Amnart Chalermchaowarit
Amnart Chalermchaowarit
Association football defenders
Amnart Chalermchaowarit
Amnart Chalermchaowarit